On Moonlight Bay is a Doris Day album (released July 2, 1951) featuring songs from the movie of the same name. It was issued by Columbia Records as a 10" LP album, catalog number CL-6186 and as a 78rpm 4 disc set, catalog number C-267.

The album was combined with Day's 1953 album, By the Light of the Silvery Moon, on a compact disc, issued on January 30, 2001 by Collectables Records.  Gordon MacRae is not featured on the album, as he was a property of Capitol records and wasn't allowed to sing on this Columbia recording.  James Emmons, a contract singer handled by Doris Day's husband, was used in his place on two songs... "Cuddle up a Little Closer" and "Till We Meet Again".

Track listing
"On Moonlight Bay" (Percy Wenrich/Edward Madden) (with the Norman Luboff Choir) 
"Till We Meet Again" (Richard A. Whiting/Raymond B. Egan) (duet with James Emmons)
"Love Ya" (Peter DeRose/Charles Tobias) (duet with Jack Smith) 
"Christmas Story" (Pauline Walsh)
"I'm Forever Blowing Bubbles" (John Kellette/Jaan Kenbrovin† (duet with Jack Smith and the Norman Luboff Choir) 
"Cuddle up a Little Closer" (Karl Hoschna/Otto Harbach) (duet with James Emmons)
"Every Little Movement (Has a Meaning All Its Own)" (Karl Hoschna/Otto Harbach) (with the Norman Luboff Choir) 
"Tell Me (Why Nights Are So Lonely)" (J. Will Callahan/Max Kortlander)

†Joint pseudonym for James Kendis, James Brockman, and Nat Vincent.

References

1951 soundtrack albums
Film soundtracks
Doris Day soundtracks
Columbia Records soundtracks